Johan Sälle (born February 21, 1967) is a Swedish former professional ice hockey player who primarily played in the Swedish Hockey League and Hockeyettan. Sälle was drafted in the eighth round of the 1988 NHL Entry Draft by the Philadelphia Flyers, but he never played professionally in North America. He spent most of his professional career in Sweden, playing eight seasons with the Malmö Redhawks.

Career statistics

References

External links

1967 births
Living people
Malmö Redhawks players
Sportspeople from Örebro
Philadelphia Flyers draft picks
Swedish ice hockey defencemen
Örebro IK players
IK Pantern players
EC Ratinger Löwen players
EC Bad Tölz players
Copenhagen Hockey players
Rødovre Mighty Bulls players